Chalpi is a village in Quijos canton, Napo Province in Ecuador.

Climate
Chalpi has a Subtropical highland climate (Cfb) with cool weather year-round and moderately heavy rainfall.

References

Napo Province